West Neyyoor is a village in Kanniyakumari district, Tamil Nadu, India.

Kanyakumari
Villages in Kanyakumari district